"Scream" is a 1990 song by British, Italy-based Eurodance artist Ice MC. It features vocals by Italian singer Alexia and is produced by Italian music producer and composer Roberto Zanetti. Screams are performed by singer Vivienne.  Released as the second single from the album, Cinema, it was a Top 20 hit in Germany, peaking at number 14 with a total of 16 weeks within the chart. A music video was also made to accompany it.

Track listing
 7" single, Scandinavia (1990)
"Scream" — 4:02
"Scream" (The Overture) — 2:30

 12", Italy (1990)
"Scream" (Extended Atomic Remix) — 6:55
"Scream" (The Overture) — 2:30
"Scream" (The Single) — 4:02

 CD maxi, Germany (1990)
"Scream" (Extended Zombie Remix) — 6:55
"Scream" (The Single) — 4:02
"Scream" (The Overture) — 2:30

 CD maxi (The U.S. Remix), Germany (1990)
"Scream" (The Break Charts Remix) — 5:15
"Scream" (The Subway Remix) — 6:05
"Scream" (The Subway Groovepella) — 3:03

Charts

References

 

1990 songs
1990 singles
Ice MC songs
ZYX Music singles